Released in 1986, Bares y Fondas (Spanish for Bars and Taverns) is the first studio album recorded by Los Fabulosos Cadillacs of Argentina. The album's main genre is Ska. The music, just like the wardrobe in the early band's concerts, was influenced by bands like Madness and The Specials. These aspects were unusual for Argentine rock bands of that period, and gave the Cadillacs (the popular shortened version of the band's name) a distinctive artistic appeal.

The album was originally going to be called "Noches Cálidas en Bares y Fondas" (Warm Nights in Bars and Taverns), based on the places where the band hung out and played, but in the end it was decided to use the shorter name, with the same meaning.

The singles of the album were the energetic "Yo Quiero Morirme Aca" ('I Want to Die Here'), the nervous "Silencio Hospital" ('Be Quiet, This is a Hospital') and the ballad "Basta de Llamarme Asi" ('Stop Calling Me That', a song composed by Vicentico as a homage to his defunct sister Tamara).

Reception 

The album was coldly received by the press, who accused the band of having simple-minded lyrics. To this Vicentico replied:

Nonetheless, in recent years Vicentico accepted that early criticism to some extent:

The Allmusic review by Victor W. Valdivia awarded the album 2 stars stating "Their first album... was barely an embryonic precursor to future glories... This is definitely a tamer, gentler Fabulosos Cadillacs... There's even a sensitive love ballad, "Galapagos," the kind that they would never even come close to again. It's obvious that at this point the Cadillacs are not much more than the sum of their influences. It's a pleasant enough listen, but hardly representative of their music, and would really be worthy only for diehards.".

Track listing
 "Vos Sin Sentimiento" ("You Without Feeling") (Flavio Cianciarulo)  – 4:38
 "Yo Quiero Morirme Acá" ("I Want to Die Here") (Vicentico) – 2:35
 "Galápagos" (Cianciarulo)  – 3:45
 "La Manera Correcta de Gritar" ("The Proper Way to Scream") (Cianciarulo)  – 3:20
 "Tus Tontas Trampas" ("Your Foolish Traps") (Cianciarulo, Riggozi)  – 2:20
 "Bares y Fondas" ("Bars and Fondas") (Vicentico, Cianciarulo)  – 3:41
 "En Mis Venas" ("In My Veins") (Vicentico) – 2:57
 "Silencio Hospital" ("Hospital, Silence") (Vicentico, Siperman) – 1:58
 "Noches Árabes" ("Arabic Nights") (Rotman, Vazzano) – 3:08
 "Estamos Perdiendo" ("We are Losing") (Vicentico, Cianciarulo) – 5:24
 "Belcha" (Cianciarulo, Giugno) – 2:49
 "Basta de Llamarme Así" ("Stop Calling Me In That Way") (Vicentico) – 4:16

Personnel 

  Vicentico – vocals
  Flavio Cianciarulo – bass
  Luciano Giugno – percussion
  Serguei Itzcowick – trumpet
  Aníbal Rigozzi – guitar
  Fernando Ricciardi – drums
  Mario Siperman – keyboard.
  Naco Goldfinger – alto saxophone
  Sergio Rotman – saxophone

References

External links 
Los Fabulosos Cadillacs Official Web Site
Bares y Fondas at MusicBrainz
[ Bares y Fondas] at Allmusic
Bares y Fondas at Discogs

1986 debut albums
Los Fabulosos Cadillacs albums